Kaiborta Gaon is a census village in Golaghat district, Assam, India. As per the 2011 Census of India, Kaiborta Gaon has a total population of 6,327 people, including 3,227 males and 3,100 females with a literacy rate of 55.56%.

References 

Assam